Trésor Luntala (born 31 May 1982) is a Congolese former professional footballer who played as a midfielder. From 2003 to 2008, he played for the DR Congo national team.

Club career
Clubs in Luntala's early career included Rennes, Birmingham City, Grasshoppers and Visé. In January 2007, he signed a contract with Ethnikos in Greece.

In December 2021, Luntala announced his retirement from his playing career following a job offer in the youth academy of his former club Rennes.

International career
He was part of the Congolese 2004 African Cup of Nations team, who finished bottom of their group in the first round of competition, thus failing to secure qualification for the quarter-finals.

References

External links

1982 births
Living people
Democratic Republic of the Congo footballers
Democratic Republic of the Congo expatriate footballers
Democratic Republic of the Congo international footballers
2004 African Cup of Nations players
En Avant Guingamp players
Birmingham City F.C. players
Grasshopper Club Zürich players
C.S. Visé players
R.A.A. Louviéroise players
Asteras Tripolis F.C. players
Ethnikos Asteras F.C. players
US Alençon players
English Football League players
Challenger Pro League players
Belgian Pro League players
Football League (Greece) players
Division d'Honneur players
Championnat National 3 players
Expatriate footballers in England
Expatriate footballers in France
Expatriate footballers in Belgium
Expatriate footballers in Greece
Association football midfielders
Footballers from Kinshasa

Stade Rennais F.C. non-playing staff